La Cité is a district (historical centre) of the city of Lausanne, in Switzerland.

The Cathedral, the Museum of Contemporary Design and Applied Arts, the Lausanne Museum of History, the Ancienne académie (today Gymnase de la cité), the Grand Council of Vaud (regional parliament), and the Château Saint-Maire are situated in this district. It is served by the Lausanne Metro Line 2, from Riponne and Bessières stations.

Gallery

Notes and references

External links 

 Festival de la cité, annual free summer festival

Lausanne